An academic minor is a college or university student's declared secondary academic discipline during their undergraduate studies. As with a major, the college or university in question lays out a framework of required classes or class types a student must complete to earn the minor – although the latitude the student is given changes from college to college. Academic minors and majors differ in that the former is subordinate to the latter – fewer courses are required to complete a minor program of study than a major program of study. To obtain an academic minor, a total of three years of study at a university in a selected subject is the usual requirement.

Some students will prepare for their intended career with their major, while pursuing personal interests with a minor, for example, majoring in civil engineering while minoring in a foreign language or performing arts. Other students may pursue a minor to provide specific specialization and thus make themselves more attractive to employers. It is not infrequent for a physics major to minor in computer science, or an engineering or economics student to minor in mathematics. Students intending to become secondary education teachers often major in their teaching subject area (for example, history or chemistry) and minor in education.

Postgraduate minor
While academic minors are usually associated with undergraduate degrees as a student's secondary focus, academic minors also exist at the postgraduate level, particularly in US institutions. Sometimes this can refer to a student's minor or secondary field within their discipline, such as a political science PhD student pursuing a major field in American politics and a minor field in political theory, or a religious studies PhD student pursuing a major field in theology and a minor field in history of religion. 
 
However, as in undergraduate courses of study, outside postgraduate study minors also exist at many universities – sometimes officially and sometimes unofficially. For example, at Oregon State University, master's and PhD students are able to pursue an official postgraduate minor in addition to the discipline of their degree. At Florida State University, postgraduate minors exist on an unofficial basis on the grounds that a master's or doctoral student takes at least 9 and at most 18 credit hours in a secondary field outside of his or her academic discipline.
Typically, an outside minor at the maximum allowed credit hours or quarter credit units (typically 18 credit hours in many public universities, or 24 credit units at others) fulfills a qualifying requirement to teach the discipline as an adjunct at a community college or state college, and the research experience and connections from an outside minor can also be tailored toward pursuing a non-academic career related to the minor field. 
Some PhD students, pursuing an outside postgraduate minor, choose to integrate the minor field into their dissertation, with a scholar from their minor field serving as an outside committee member on their dissertation.

See also
 Academia
 British undergraduate degree classification
 Curriculum
 Double degree
 Higher education

School terminology
Academic degrees